Schizothorax macropogon is a species of ray-finned fish in the genus Schizothorax which is known only from the upper Brahmaputra River in Tibet.

References 

Schizothorax
Fish described in 1905